Rukometni klub Budvanska rivijera is a Montenegrin handball club from Budva, that plays in Montenegrin First League.

History

RK Budvanska rivijera is among the youngest handball clubs in Montenegro. It was formed in 2006, under the name RK Stari grad. After two seasons in the Second League, club gained promotion to the First League at the end of 2007/08 season. During the summer of 2008, club was renamed into RK Budvanska rivijera.

During the period 2008–2013, Budvanska Rivijera became a regular participant of the strongest handball league in Montenegro, even playing two seasons in the European cups.

In the season 2015–16, Budvanska Rivijera won the champions title in Montenegrin First League, after a hard struggle with RK Lovćen and RK Boka. This was a historical success for the team from Budva.

Unfortunately, the team fell into a financial crisis, which soon led to a relegation from the Montenegrin highest handball competition. Next few seasons were tough, with many key players, that have won the championship in 2015/16, leaving the club. Budvanska rivijera, however, managed to stabilize and finally returned to the Montenegrin First League in 2018. As of 2022, it is still playing in it.

After regaining a place among the strongest Montenegrin handball clubs in 2018, Budvanska rivijera once again started building a championship team. They proved to be a very competent and strong opponent to Lovćen. Finally, in the season 2021/22, after long 6 years and many problems and rebuilding, Budvanska rivijera managed to reclaim the title of a Montenegrin handball champion, becoming only the third Montenegrin team to win multiple championship titles (alongside Lovćen and Budućnost).

Honours and achievements
National Championships - 2

Champion of Montenegro (2) 
2016, 2022

First League seasons

RK Budvanska rivijera played in the Montenegrin First League during the seasons 2008/09, 2009/10, 2010/11, 2011/12, 2012/13, 2013/14, 2014/15, 2015/16, 2018/19, 2019/20, 2020/21, 2021/22.

European Cups

Budvanska rivijera has played three seasons in the EHF European competitions:

2009/10 - EHF Challenge Cup

2010/11 - EHF Challenge Cup

2016/17 - EHF Cup

Matches

Current squad

Famous players

 Goran Đukanović

External links
Handball Federation of Montenegro

Budvanska rivijera
Handball clubs established in 2006
2006 establishments in Montenegro
Sport in Budva